Ban Phanao station is a railway station located in Phanao Subdistrict, Mueang Nakhon Ratchasima District, Nakhon Ratchasima Province.

References 

Railway stations in Thailand
Nakhon Ratchasima province